Sheykh Rahman (also Romanized as Sheykh Raḩmān; also known as Sheykh Raḩmānī) is a village in Shoaybiyeh-ye Gharbi Rural District, Shadravan District, Shushtar County, Khuzestan Province, Iran. At the 2006 census, its population was 100, in 14 families.

References 

Populated places in Shushtar County